As of 2009, it is estimated that there are 33.3 million people worldwide infected with HIV. HIV/AIDS prevalence rates in South America vary from 0.20% in Bolivia to 1.50% in Trinidad and Tobago.

Prevalence per country 
HIV/AIDS in Argentina

 According to the CIA World Factbook in 2011, as of 2007, the adult prevalence rate is estimated to be 0.50%.

HIV/AIDS in Bolivia

 According to the CIA World Factbook in 2011, as of 2007, the adult prevalence rate is estimated to be 0.20%.

HIV/AIDS in Brazil

 According to the CIA World Factbook in 2011, as of 2007, the adult prevalence rate is estimated to be 0.60%.

HIV/AIDS in Chile

 According to the CIA World Factbook in 2011, as of 2007, the adult prevalence rate in Chile is estimated to be 0.30%.

HIV/AIDS in Colombia

 According to the CIA World Factbook in 2011, as of 2007, the adult prevalence rate is estimated to be 0.60%.

HIV/AIDS in Ecuador

 According to the CIA World Factbook in 2011, as of 2007, the adult prevalence rate in Ecuador is estimated to be 0.30%.

HIV/AIDS in French Guiana
HIV/AIDS in Guyana

 As of 2011 the adult prevalence rate in Guyana is estimated to be 1%.

HIV/AIDS in Paraguay

 According to the CIA World Factbook in 2011, as of 2007, the adult prevalence rate is estimated to be 0.60%.

HIV/AIDS in Peru

 According to the CIA World Factbook in 2011, as of 2007, the adult prevalence rate is estimated to be 0.50%.

HIV/AIDS in Suriname

 As of 2011, the adult prevalence rate is estimated to be 1.00%.

HIV/AIDS in Uruguay

 As of 2007, the adult prevalence rate is estimated to be 0.60%.

HIV/AIDS in Venezuela

 As of 2001, the adult prevalence rate is estimated to be 0.70%.

See also
 HIV/AIDS in Africa
 HIV/AIDS in Asia
 HIV/AIDS in Europe
 HIV/AIDS in North America
 List of countries by HIV/AIDS adult prevalence rate

References

 
Health in South America